Lo Pasado, Pasado (The past, is past) is a studio album by Mexican singer José José, released in 1978. The album has the participation of the popular singers/composers Juan Gabriel and José María Napoleón. The first single of the album was the song "Lo pasado, pasado", that instantly became a hit. After that, the singles "Almohada", "Lo que no fue, no será" and "Te quiero tal como eres" (a Spanish-language cover of Billy Joel's "Just the Way You Are") became hits.

Track listing

1978 albums
José José albums
Spanish-language albums